Bruce Reed may refer to:
Bruce Reed (political operative) (born 1960), American political adviser
Bruce Reed (mathematician), Canadian mathematician and computer scientist
Bruce Reed (wrestler) or Butch Reed (1954–2021), American professional wrestler

See also
Bruce Reid (disambiguation)